In quantum mechanics, universality is the observation that there are properties for a large class of systems that are independent of the exact structural details of the system. The notion of universality is familiar in the study and application of statistical mechanics to various physical systems since its introduction in a very precise fashion by Leo Kadanoff. Although not quite the same, it is closely related to universality as applied to quantum systems. This concept links to the essence of renormalization and scaling in many problems. An important consequence of universality is that one can mimic the real short-structure distance of the measurement device and the system to be measured by simple short-distance structure. Even though it is seen that scaling, universality and renormalization are closely related, they are not to be used interchangeably.

Universal characteristics of shapes of potential steps

For low energy particles, the exact detail of the potential step is irrelevant. An important consequence of this is that theoretical calculations made for a Heaviside step function potential work perfectly well for potentials that have a finite spatial rate of change in potential: finite ∆ over ∆, which is the case with physical situations, for e.g. - quantum confinement systems of nano dots, etc.

For a general potential barrier:

The time-dependent Schrödinger's equation in one-dimension is:

It is instructive to analyse this equation after expanding  in the plane wave basis . For when , the relevant length scale in this problem is the range of the wavefunction under the barrier which is given by:    for low energy particles, i.e. - . When , the wave cannot resolve the detailed shape of the potential and one must have . The wavelength of a particle in the region of zero potential (essentially, a free particle) with energy  is given as: . For low-energy waves incident on this potential from the left: . Essentially, for low energy, or large wavelength, particles, the exact detail of the potential barrier is irrelevant. This is a feature that is universal to different  for a well behaved function .

Universal characteristics of potential barriers

Potentials display universality in their structural aspects and their resonance phenomena. For scattering at a finite potential barrier of height , the time-independent Schrödinger equation for the wave function  reads:

where  is the Hamiltonian,  is the (reduced)
Planck constant,  is the mass,   the energy of the particle and

is the barrier potential with height  and width .  is the Heaviside step function.

With the subscripts I, II and III to  given by the regions of y mentioned alongside their expressions.

For a wave that is incident from the left, we have  and one finds the reflection coefficient to be:

The wavelength of the incident wave is an exact multiple of the barrier width whenever . In terms of the dimensionless variables, these resonances in scattering from potentials occur at energies, .

The quantity  defined as:

is a shape property of the potential, and is independent of the energy. This can be heuristically understood as a relation to the relevant length scales in the problem:  is the length of the potential and this identifies a momentum scale for this problem as, setting , .

Using , the reflection coefficient becomes:

For , one finds  ≅  ∝ . A very simple proof of above for one dimensional system is given by observing that once the shape of potential is determined, reflectivity becomes a function of energy only.

Further from its definition it is clear that its maximum and minimum value are 1 and 0 respectively. At the resonance energy  the reflectivity is 0.

Making a Taylor expansion of 

As at resonance energy , the reflectivity is minimum, and therefore we have   

So near resonance energy, .

So near resonance energy we have, .

Other systems
A complex current source  of size d that generates radiation with wavelengths  is accurately mimicked by a sum of point-like multipole currents. The multipole expansion is a simple example of a renormalization analysis. In thinking about the long-wavelength radiation it is generally much easier to treat the
source as a sum of multipoles than to deal with the true current directly. This is particularly true since usually only one or two multipoles are needed for sufficient accuracy.

In a quantum field theory, a quantum fluctuation probes arbitrarily short distances. This is evident when one computes radiative corrections in perturbation theory which seem infinitely sensitive to short-distance behavior. Universality tells us that to look at the low momentum physics, or the large wavelength limit, we do not need to know what happens at large momenta. As in the multipole expansion, we can replicate the highly non-trivial high-energy by a generic set of effective point-like interactions.

References

Quantum mechanics